David M. Stevenson (17 January 1882 – 12 January 1938) was an Ulster Scot road racing cyclist who competed in the 1912 Summer Olympics. He was born in Clough, Ireland. In 1912 he was a member of the Scotland cycling team which finished fourth in the team time trial event. In the individual time trial competition he finished 41st.

References

1882 births
1938 deaths
Scottish male cyclists
Olympic cyclists of Great Britain
Cyclists at the 1912 Summer Olympics
Scottish Olympic competitors
Sportspeople from County Down
Ulster Scots people